Alan Woods (1945 – 26 January 2008) was an Australian and Hong Kong professional gambler and mathematician considered among the biggest gamblers in the world.
Woods focused on blackjack and betting on horse racing. He has worked with Bill Benter and Zeljko Ranogajec during his career and "pioneered quantitative gambling by betting on Hong Kong horse races". His estimated net worth at the time of his death was AU$670 million.

Early life
Woods was raised in Murwillumbah, New South Wales, Australia. His parents ran a newsagency, followed by a cordial factory and a hotel. Woods was not exposed to gambling in his youth and played solo whist with his family. He studied mathematics at the University of New England, in Armidale but dropped out his final year before graduating. There, Woods began playing poker machines and described himself as a losing player. He stopped due to a relocation to Sydney where poker machines were not available. He also worked for a time as an insurance actuary.

Woods also picked up horse betting during college and won his first bet. Unlike in poker and solo, Woods was generally losing betting on horses and developed a gambling habit.

Gambling career 
Woods was introduced to card counting in blackjack from his fellow bridge players. He tested the method and won a few thousand dollars. Woods did not focus on gambling seriously until his wife left him in 1979. Afterwards, he played blackjack in Hobart and won $16,000 in four months. He moved to Las Vegas where he won an additional $100,000 playing blackjack around the clock. Later, he moved on to play in casinos across  Europe, Australia, and Asia.

Woods retired from professional blackjack in 1982 and focused on horse betting in Hong Kong due to the small pool of horses. There, he met Bob Moore and Bill Benter. Benter and Woods worked on a computer model "based on mathematics, to choose race winners based on formulaic consideration of track, form, weather and other factors". The model began generating $100,000 in the 1987 racing season. That same year, Benter and Woods dissolved the partnership.

Woods traveled to Manila and worked with Zeljko Ranogajec, who he also described as a rival. By the 1990s, Woods had won millions from horse betting.

Personal life
Woods married Meredith in 1972; the two separated in 1979. They had two children, Anthony and Vicky. Woods was against the Iraq War and described himself as a former conservative turned liberal.

Death
Woods died of appendiceal cancer on 25 January 2008 shortly after he was diagnosed.

See also
 Billy Walters (gambler)

References

Australian gamblers
1945 births
2008 deaths
Australian Blackjack players
Australian contract bridge players
Australian actuaries
Deaths from appendiceal cancer
Deaths from cancer in Hong Kong